Terrace Hills Pasture is an  biological Site of Special Scientific Interest north of Eastwell in Leicestershire.

This site has been designated an SSSI as an example of old calcareous pasture, but some areas are former quarries, and as a result there is an undulating terrain. The dominant grasses are crested dog's-tail, sweet vernal grass and red fescue, and there is also a small stream with an area of marsh.

The site is composed of two adjoining fields. There is no public access to the larger western field, but a public footpath goes through the smaller eastern one.

References

Sites of Special Scientific Interest in Leicestershire